A by-election was held for the New South Wales Legislative Assembly electorate of Redfern on 8 July 1889 because of the death  of John Sutherland.

Dates

Candidates

 George Anderson was a wool merchant and a past Mayor of Waterloo who had been unsuccessful at the election in January 1889 by a margin of 114 votes (0.5%).
 William Schey was the secretary of the Railways and Tramways Association and the district included the Eveleigh Railway Yards. He had been elected as a Free Trade member for Redfern in 1887, however he switched to the Protectionist party for the 1889 election where he finished last with a margin of 1,505 votes (6.9%).

Result

John Sutherland died.

See also
Electoral results for the district of Redfern
List of New South Wales state by-elections

References

New South Wales state by-elections
1889 elections in Australia
1890s in New South Wales